Ashleigh Barty and Sally Peers were the defending champions, having won the event in 2012, but Barty chose to participate in the 2013 Birmingham Classic during that week and Peers chose not to participate.

Julie Coin and Stéphanie Foretz Gacon won the 2013 title, defeating Julia Glushko and Erika Sema in the final, 6–2, 6–4.

Seeds

Draw

References 
 Draw

Nottingham Challenge - Women's Doubles
2013 Women's Doubles